Air Alpha Greenland was a subsidiary of Air Alpha, an aircraft company based in Odense, Denmark. Air Alpha Greenland operated flights in Greenland from Ilulissat. The subsidiary was founded in 1994. On 28 July 2006, it was sold to Air Greenland.

Fleet

 6 Bell 222
 1 Bell 206 LongRanger
 1 Eurocopter AS350B3
2 Cessna 208B Grand Caravan

References

External links
 

Defunct airlines of Denmark
Defunct airlines of Greenland
Defunct helicopter airlines
Ilulissat
Airlines established in 1994
Airlines disestablished in 2006
1994 establishments in Denmark
2006 disestablishments in Denmark